Cary Woodworth (born 1977) is an American actor and singer-songwriter.

Early life
Woodworth was born in New Brunswick, New Jersey.  His mother is German and his father is American.  Woodworth grew up in East Brunswick, New Jersey, and graduated from East Brunswick High School. He holds a Bachelor of Arts Degree in Economics from Rutgers University.

Career
Woodworth made his film acting debut in the 1999 independent film The Money Shot and appeared as Jeff in the made-for-television movie Mary and Rhoda in 2000. In 2004, Woodworth was cast opposite Edison Chen in the British/Chinese film Life Translated. Through the Chinese premiere of the film, Woodworth began to learn Mandarin which he now speaks fluently.

In 2005, Woodworth co-starred in a series of Maybelline commercials with Adriana Lima and Zhang Ziyi which aired worldwide.

Woodworth created history in April 2006 by becoming the first foreign lead of a Mainland Chinese film when he was cast as an American war journalist in the historical drama China 1949. The film centers on Woodworth's foreign correspondent character, as he struggles through war and politics to get to the truth of the events leading up to the Communist Party of China (CPC) victory against the Kuomintang (KMT) in the Chinese Civil War in 1949.  Since then he has been cast as a lead role in two drama series for CCTV and leads in independent feature films.

Woodworth began writing songs and has recently been performing them in different cities across the United States.

Selected filmography

Trivia
In China, Woodworth was given the name 张云龙 by a master. He was first asked to choose the surname.  The first name that came out was Zhāng (张). The master then gave him Yún (云) which means cloud, and Lóng (龙) which means dragon. Therefore, his name means "Dragon in the Clouds".

He speaks German and Mandarin. Cary is left-handed.

References

External links
 
 

1977 births
Living people
American male film actors
American male television actors
American male singer-songwriters
American singer-songwriters
American people of German descent
East Brunswick High School alumni
People from East Brunswick, New Jersey
People from New Brunswick, New Jersey
Rutgers University alumni
21st-century American singers
21st-century American male singers